Aster is a developing neighbourhood in southeast Edmonton, Alberta, Canada. It was named for the flowering plant genus Aster, of which heath aster and flat-topped white aster are most common in Alberta.

Aster is located within The Meadows area and was originally identified as Neighbourhood 5 within The Meadows Area Structure Plan (ASP). It was officially named Aster on April 30, 2014.

It is bounded on the west by 17 Street NW, north by a future realignment of 23 Avenue NW, and east and south by Anthony Henday Drive.

Surrounding neighbourhoods

References 

Neighbourhoods in Edmonton